Rolf Gysin is a Swiss Olympic middle-distance runner. He represented his country in the men's 1500 meters and 800 meters at the 1976 Summer Olympics and 800 meters at the 1972 Summer Olympics. His personal best was a 1:45.97 in 800 meters and a 3:37.7 in 1500 meters.

References 

Living people
Swiss male middle-distance runners
1952 births
Olympic athletes of Switzerland
Athletes (track and field) at the 1972 Summer Olympics
Athletes (track and field) at the 1976 Summer Olympics